The Macroheterocera are a well supported clade of moths that are closely related to butterflies and other macro-moths.

Taxonomy
The Macroheterocera includes the following superfamilies:
 Mimallonoidea – sack bearers (variously included in basal position or excluded)
 Drepanoidea – drepanids
 Noctuoidea – owlet moths
 Geometroidea – inchworms
 Lasiocampoidea – lappet moths
 Bombycoidea – bombycoid moths

The macroheteroceran superfamilies were previously place in the Macrolepidoptera, but recent molecular studies have failed to recover the Macrolepidoptera as a monophyletic group. The latter grouping also included true butterflies (Papilionoidea), New World butterfly-moths (Hedylidae), and Old World butterfly-moths (Calliduloidea).

References

 
Moth taxonomy
Obtectomera